Golubac is a village and municipality located in the Braničevo District of eastern Serbia. Situated on the right side of the Danube river, it is bordered by Romania to the east, Veliko Gradište to the west and Kučevo to the south. The population of the village is 1,655 and the population of the municipality is 8,331. Due to many nearby archeological sites and the Đerdap national park, the village is a popular tourist, fishing and sailing destination.

Name

In Serbian, the town is known as Golubac (Голубац), derived from golub ("pigeon" or "dove") and is therefore often translated as "the town of doves." Other names:  (also known as Golumbacu Mare or Columbacu),  and  meaning "dovecote."  

Historically, it was known as Columbria in Latin, a contraction of (castrum) Columbaria meaning "city of pigeons" (Latin: Columba, Greek: kòlymbos), and as a city derived from Cuppae during pre-Roman times.

History
It was a stronghold called Cuppae during Roman and Early Byzantine times (1-6th century) and turned into a city (Columbria) in 554/5 AD.

Archeological sites include the remnants of one of Roman Emperor Trajan's tables near Trajan's Bridge, found along his road through the Danube's Iron Gates; and the Roman fortress Diana. Golubac fortress, 4 km downstream, is from the 14th century and also of interest. The fortress was the scene of a battle against the Turks in 1428, where the Polish knight Zawisza Czarny was captured and executed by the Turks.

Charles I of Hungary conquered the castle in 1334. In 1387 Lazar of Serbia sieged it. Becoming a Hungarian ally in 1403–04, he received large possessions, including the important Belgrade and Golubac Fortress. The Turkish occupied it for the first time in 1391, but after that, Péter Perényi recaptured it. King Sigismund of Hungary acquired Golubac by a contract in 1427, but its Serbian captain sold it to the Turks for twelve thousand golds. Sigismund sieged the fortress in spring 1428 in response, but the mission was a failure, the King himself was almost killed by the Turks. In 1458, Matthias Corvinus tried to recapture it, but the siege was interrupted by Hungarian internal conflicts.

From 1929 to 1941, Golubac was part of the Morava Banovina of the Kingdom of Yugoslavia.

Demographics
According to the 2011 census results, the municipality of Golubac has a population of 8,331 inhabitants.

Ethnic groups
The ethnic composition of the municipality:

Economy
The following table gives a preview of total number of employed people per their core activity (as of 2017):

Tourism
The Iron Gate national park is noted for its natural environment and its hunting grounds, as well as its hiking trails. The village's quay along the Danube river is popular for more relaxed hiking.

Sailing
Golubac has become a well-known sailing site. The Sailing Center of the Sailing Association of Serbia, which the Serbian National Team uses for ground preparations before major sailing events, is located in Golubac. One of the events is a sailing Regatta, which is traditionally held in August. During the summer, the Center holds an Optimist Class sailing camp, where beginners can learn from the best Serbian sailors and their international guests.

See also
List of places in Serbia

References

External links

Populated places in Braničevo District
Municipalities and cities of Southern and Eastern Serbia